Lin Ping is a Chinese swimmer.  She won a gold medal at the 2016 Paralympic Games.  She competes in the Paralympic class SM9. She also won gold at the 2012 Paralympic Games in London in the 50m freestyle S9.

References

Paralympic swimmers of China
Swimmers at the 2016 Summer Paralympics
Paralympic gold medalists for China
Living people
Medalists at the 2016 Summer Paralympics
Year of birth missing (living people)
Chinese female freestyle swimmers
21st-century Chinese women